Greens Morelle could refer to:

 Morelle greens, part of Malagasy cuisine
 Utica greens, an Italian-American escarole dish